Baeckea omissa is a species of flowering plant in the family Myrtaceae and is endemic to eastern Australia. It is a shrub with egg-shaped to lance-shaped leaves with the narrower end towards the base and white flowers mostly with ten to fifteen stamens.

Description

Taxonomy
Baeckea omissa was first formally described in 1997 by Anthony Bean in the journal Telopea from specimens he collected near Tenterfield in 1993. The specific epithet (omissa) means "neglected or overlooked", referring to the late recognition of this taxon.

Distribution and habitat
This baeckea grows in heathy swamp and is common and widespread from near Stanthorpe in Queensland  to the New England National Park and near Torrington in New South Wales.

References

Flora of New South Wales
Flora of Queensland
omissa
Plants described in 1997
Taxa named by Anthony Bean